Hjørring railway station is the main railway station serving the town of Hjørring in Vendsyssel, Denmark.

Hjørring station is located on the Vendsyssel Line from Aalborg to Frederikshavn and is the terminus of the Hirtshalsbanen railway line from Hjørring to Hirtshals. The station opened in 1871. It offers direct regional rail services to Aalborg and Frederikshavn,  as well as local train services to Hirtshals, both operated by Nordjyske Jernbaner.

History 

The station opened in 1871 as the branch from Nørresundby to Frederikshavn of the new Nørresundby-Frederikshavn railway line opened on 16 August 1871. The station building was designed by the architect Thomas Arboe.

On 7 January 1879, at the opening of the Limfjord Railway Bridge, the Vendsyssel line was connected with Aalborg station, the Randers-Aalborg railway line and the rest of the Danish rail network.

In 1942, the station became the terminal station of the Hjørring-Løkken-Aabybro Line, the Hjørring-Hørby Line and the Hjørring-Hirtshals Line, as the trains from Hjørring Privatbaner were moved from Hjørring West station to the mainline station. The Hjørring-Hørby Line was closed in 1953 and the Hjørring-Løkken-Aabybro Line in 1963, so that today only the Hirtshals Line remains as the only branch line from Hjørring Station.

Facilities 
Inside the station building there is a combined ticket office and convenience store operated by 7-Eleven, waiting room, toilets and lockers.

Adjacent to the station is the Hjørring bus terminal.

Services
The station offers direct regional rail services to Aalborg and Frederikshavn,  as well as local train services to Hirtshals, both operated by Nordjyske Jernbaner.

See also
 List of railway stations in Denmark

References

Citations

Bibliography

External links

 Banedanmark – government agency responsible for maintenance and traffic control of most of the Danish railway network
 Nordjyske Jernbaner – Danish railway company operating in North Jutland Region
 Danske Jernbaner – website with information on railway history in Denmark
 Nordjyllands Jernbaner – website with information on railway history in North Jutland

Hjørring
Railway stations in the North Jutland Region
Railway stations opened in 1871
Niels Peder Christian Holsøe railway stations
Thomas Arboe railway stations
Railway stations in Denmark opened in the 19th century